Amoebaean singing is a type of singing competition originating in Ancient Greece. In it, a first party sings according to a topic and verse structure of their choosing. A second singer then responds with the same verse structure and on a related topic. This repeats until one side concedes or a third party can determine the winner.

History
The form is believed to have been used by Greek shepherds to entertain themselves. Later, it would evolve into a judged competition, consisting of multiple rounds of singing between competitors. Competitors would be judged more favorably if they could continue a theme through multiple rounds.

The poet Theocritus relied heavily on Amoebaean singing, with it becoming his and his successors' "hallmark", according to David M. Halperin.

Usage
Amoebaean singing can be seen in Theocritus' Idyll 5: The Goatherd and the Shepherd, in an exchange between the goatherd Comatas and the shepherd Lacon.

References

Ancient Greek music
Singing competitions